Hounds of Love is a 2016 Australian crime thriller film written and directed by Ben Young. The plot concerns a couple who kidnap and terrorise a young woman in the suburbs of Perth, Western Australia, and was loosely based upon the crimes of David and Catherine Birnie. The film is Young's directorial debut. It was selected in the Venice Days competition at the 73rd edition of the Venice Film Festival, in which Ashleigh Cummings was awarded a Fedeora Award for best actress.

Plot 

Vicki Maloney, an intelligent and charismatic teenager inwardly struggling with her parents’ recent separation, spends the weekend at her mother's house in outer suburbia. After a heated argument between them, Vicki defiantly sneaks out to attend a party and is lured into the car of a seemingly trustworthy couple, John and Evelyn White.

Vicki soon finds herself held captive at John and Evelyn's house where she is forced into a dark world of violence and domination. With no way to escape and her murder imminent, Vicki realises she must find a way to drive a wedge between them if she is to survive.  Vicki tries exploiting Evelyn's desire to see her absent children, unfortunately John's emotional hold over Evelyn is too strong and her efforts to turn them against each other only fuels Evelyn's will to see her die. Broken and tormented, Vicki accepts her fate may soon lie at the bottom of a shallow bush grave.

Vicki's desperate mother Maggie will stop at nothing to find her missing child and enlists the help of her estranged husband Trevor and Vicki's boyfriend Jason. When Maggie's search eventually leads her to John and Evelyn's street, she calls out for her daughter in vain.  Hearing her, Vicki finds the strength for one last attempt at survival by forcing Evelyn to realise if she ever wants to see her children again, she must break free from John's evil spell. When John attempts to strangle Vicki to death, he is stabbed to death by Evelyn. Vicki escapes from the house and defiantly walks past the knife-wielding Evelyn, who allows Vicki to pass. Driving away, Maggie sees the bloodied Vicky in her rear-view mirror. She stops the car and is reunited with her daughter.

Cast 
  Emma Booth as  Evelyn White
  Ashleigh Cummings as Vicki Maloney
  Stephen Curry as John White
  Susie Porter as Maggie Maloney
  Damian De Montemas as Trevor Maloney
  Harrison Gilbertson as Jason Farris
  Fletcher Humphrys as Gary

Real-life inspiration and controversy
David and Catherine Birnie were a suburban Perth couple who, between October–November 1986, kidnapped, raped, and murdered four women, all of whom were subsequently buried in shallow graves. The victims were 22-year-old Mary Neilson, 15-year-old Susannah Candy, 31-year-old Noelene Patterson, and 21-year-old Denise Brown. The Birnies attempted to murder a fifth abductee, 18-year-old Kate Moir, who escaped the Birnies' house the day after her capture; Moir's escape and subsequent statement to the police led to the Birnies' arrest.

The film's John and Evelyn White correspond approximately to David and Catherine Birnie, although the background of the Whites' relationship differs significantly from the relationship of the Birnies (who first met each other and began their relationship when they were teenagers of roughly the same age; in Hounds of Love, Evelyn is younger than John and it is revealed she was groomed by him, leading to her psychological dependency and need to assist in his crimes). The film's John White has a mental hold over Evelyn that is only broken at the end; in real life, Catherine Birnie was the dominant partner in the relationship, with their escapee Kate Moir attesting that "David was the puppet, Catherine was the puppeteer."

The film's denouement, in which Evelyn murders John, bears no relation with what happened to the Birnies, who were both arrested, tried, and imprisoned for their crimes. Catherine Birnie was reportedly "unrepentant" and believed what she and David Birnie did was "logical."

The film's Vicki Maloney is a composite character who most closely resembles Susannah Candy and Kate Moir, the Birnies' two known teenage victims. Like Susannah Candy, Vicki is depicted as the teenage schoolgirl daughter of a prominent Perth surgeon. Susannah Candy was abducted by the Birnies whilst hitchhiking on the Stirling Highway; in Hounds of Love, dialogue indicates Vicki is walking towards a highway before the Whites pick her up on the road. Susannah Candy was forced by the Birnies to send letters to her family to assure them she was all right, which happens to Vicki in the film; also, Susannah Candy was forced to ingest sleeping pills, as Evelyn attempts to do to Vicki. Vicki also resembles Kate Moir inasmuch as she manages to flee her abductors' home as Kate Moir did.

Hounds of Love writer/director Ben Young pointed out that the film is not marketed as a "true crime" story, stating, "Due to the premise, it’s inevitable some people will draw comparisons to the heinous crimes of a Western Australian couple. However, it’s our hope that due to the handling of the material this will not happen outside WA where people are less familiar with their crimes. [Our] intention was never to provide notoriety for those not worthy of it. I studied nine similar cases involving couples to try and gain an insight into their psychology, not to find plot points. All references to the couple in regards to our film have been nothing but speculation. Rather [we wanted] to make a challenging film examining issues of co-dependence, control and domestic violence."

Kate Moir, the Birnies' one surviving victim, publicly criticised the production of Hounds of Love,  stating, "I feel taken advantage of and confused — why give [the Birnies] oxygen? It is disappointing because I just want them forgotten.” The review of Hounds of Love in The New York Times notes, "That the news media in Western Australia has noted [the film's] similarities to a real case — the 1986 murder spree of David and Catherine Birnie — only heightens the sense of exploitation."

Reception

The film was given a limited theatrical release in June 2017 and was met with critical praise. On review aggregator website Rotten Tomatoes, the film holds an approval rating of 88%, based on 98 reviews, and an average rating of 7.3/10. The website's critical consensus reads, "Smartly constructed and powerfully acted, Hounds of Love satisfies as a psychological thriller with a few nasty surprises — and marks writer-director Ben Young as a promising talent." On Metacritic, the film has a weighted average score of 73 out of 100, based on 18 critics, indicating "generally favourable reviews".

Critics found common ground in their enthusiasm about the psychological component to the horror depicted, as well as various technical aspects, particularly the cinematography and direction.

The film was nominated for 9 AACTA awards in 2017 winning Emma Booth a Best Actress in a Feature Film Award.

Accolades

References

External links 

2016 films
2016 horror films
2016 crime thriller films
2016 horror thriller films
Australian crime thriller films
Australian horror thriller films
2016 directorial debut films
Films about kidnapping
2010s English-language films